Maciej Skorża (born 10 January 1972) is a former Polish professional footballer. He is currently the manager of J1 League club Urawa Red Diamonds.

Club career
He was playing as a defender for Radomiak Radom and AZS-AWF Warsaw.

Managerial career

In 1994, he began his coaching career as a youth coach for Legia Warsaw. He managed SMS Piaseczno during the 1998–99 season. From 1999 to 2003, he coached the Amica Wronki youth team and was successful in winning a league title in 2002. He also was an assistant to Mirosław Jabłoński while at Wisła Płock.

In May 2003, Paweł Janas appointed Skorża as an assistant coach for the Poland national football team. However, following Poland's elimination from the 2006 FIFA World Cup group stage, the entire staff, including Skorża, was sacked by the Polish Football Association.

He had a short spell at Wisła Płock as an assistant manager before returning to Amica Wronki as a manager in 2004. In the 2004–05 season, Skorża became the first Polish coach to manage to qualify a Polish football club to the group stage of the UEFA Cup. In the 2006–2007 season, he joined Dyskobolia Grodzisk Wielkopolski and won the Polish Cup and Ekstraklasa Cup. On 13 June 2007 Skorża was appointed as the manager of Wisła Kraków which he led twice to a league title, winning Ekstraklasa in seasons 2007–08 and 2008–09. He worked with Wisła Kraków until 15 March 2010, when the Wisła's board of directors fired him after a series of three games without a win, in spite of the club holding the lead of the league.

On 1 June he was announced as the new manager of Legia Warsaw. On 30 May 2012, Skorża's two-year spell as the Legia manager came to an end.

On 1 September 2014, Skorża began his tenure as manager of Lech Poznań, signing a three-year contract with the club. In his first season in charge, Lech Poznań won Polish Ekstraklasa with a 0-0 draw with Wisła Kraków. This was the third Polish title in his managerial career. This game was watched by 41,545 of fans from the stand, the highest attendance of the entire 2014–15 season in Poland. Lech started the next season with a Polish Super Cup 3–1 home win over Legia Warsaw. The game was attended by 40,088 fans, which is the record for the Super Cup's competition audience size.

From 19 March 2018 to 28 February 2020, Skorża led United Arab Emirates national under-23 team.

On 10 April 2021, he was announced as the manager of Lech Poznań. He officially took over this position on 12 April. In the 2021–22 season, during which the club celebrated its 100th anniversary, Skorża led Lech to its 8th championship and finished as runners-up in Polish Cup. On 6 June 2022, he was granted release from his contract, citing personal reasons.

On 10 November 2022, he ended his hiatus when it was announced he would take over as Urawa Red Diamonds' manager from the 2023 season onwards.

Managerial statistics 
.

Honours

Manager

Amica Wronki youth
 Football Junior Championships of Poland: 2002

Dyskobolia
 Polish Cup: 2006–07
 Ekstraklasa Cup: 2007

Wisła Kraków
 Ekstraklasa: 2007–08, 2008–09

Legia Warsaw
 Polish Cup: 2010–11, 2011–12
 Ekstraklasa: 2011-12, 2011-12

Lech Poznań
 Ekstraklasa: 2014–15, 2021–22
 Polish Super Cup: 2015

References

External links

1972 births
Living people
People from Radom
Sportspeople from Masovian Voivodeship
Polish football managers
Amica Wronki managers
Dyskobolia Grodzisk Wielkopolski managers
Wisła Kraków managers
Legia Warsaw managers
Lech Poznań managers
Pogoń Szczecin managers
Ettifaq FC managers
J1 League managers
Urawa Red Diamonds managers
Ekstraklasa managers
Saudi Professional League managers
Polish expatriate football managers
Polish expatriate sportspeople in Saudi Arabia
Polish expatriate sportspeople in the United Arab Emirates
Polish expatriate sportspeople in Japan